Rickard Hollow is a tributary of Green Creek in Columbia County, Pennsylvania, in the United States. The stream itself has two unnamed tributaries and sewage is discharged into it. The exact origin of its name is not known.

Course
Rickard Hollow begins in a deep valley in Fishing Creek Township, a few hundred feet west of the western edge of Stillwater. It flows southwest for a short distance before turning south-southwest for several tenths of a mile. The stream then turns west for a short distance, receiving an unnamed tributary of passing through a pond. It then turns south-southwest, flowing alongside T-633, which it crosses once. The stream eventually receives another unnamed tributary and enters Greenwood Township and Rohrsburg and continues flowing south-southwest. Eventually, it crosses Rohrsburg Road and turns roughly south. A few tenths of a mile further downstream, it reaches its confluence with Green Creek.

Tributaries
Rickard Hollow has no named tributaries. However, it does have two unnamed tributaries.

Geography and watershed
The stream is close to the Greenwood Valley and to another valley known as Davis Hollow.

The Greenwood Township Municipal Authority has a permit to discharge sewage into Rickard Hollow. It is waived by the United States Department of Environmental Protection. This is considered to be a minor discharge, with a discharge of only 7500 gallons per day.

Both the mouth and the source of the stream are in the United States Geological Survey quadrangle of Benton.

History and etymology
Rickard Hollow was entered into the Geographic Names Information System on August 2, 1979. Its identifier in the Geographic Names Information System is 1185024.

The origin of Rickard Hollow's name is unknown. However, it is likely to be named after a local farmer or landowner.

See also
Mud Run, next tributary of Green Creek going downstream
Little Green Creek, next tributary of Green Creek going upstream
List of tributaries of Fishing Creek (North Branch Susquehanna River)

References

External links
Topographic maps of Rickard Hollow

Rivers of Columbia County, Pennsylvania
Tributaries of Fishing Creek (North Branch Susquehanna River)
Rivers of Pennsylvania